D223 is a state road in the southern Croatia connecting the Brgat border crossing to Bosnia and Herzegovina to the D8 state road near Dubrovnik.

The road, as well as all other state roads in Croatia, is managed and maintained by Hrvatske ceste, state owned company.

Road junctions and populated areas

Sources

State roads in Croatia
Transport in Dubrovnik-Neretva County